William Byrom (30 March 1915 – March 1989) was an English professional footballer who played as a full-back in the Football League for Burnley, Queens Park Rangers and Rochdale and in non-League football for Rossendale United and Stalybridge Celtic.

References

1915 births
1989 deaths
Footballers from Blackburn
English footballers
Association football fullbacks
English Football League players
Rossendale United F.C. players
Burnley F.C. players
Queens Park Rangers F.C. players
Rochdale A.F.C. players
Rochdale A.F.C. wartime guest players
Stalybridge Celtic F.C. players